"Duje" is a song by Kosovo-Albanian singer Albina Kelmendi and five members of her family, released on 19 December 2022. The song is scheduled to represent Albania in the Eurovision Song Contest 2023 after winning the televote of Festivali i Këngës 61, Albania's selection for that year's Eurovision Song Contest.

Eurovision Song Contest

Festivali i Këngës 61 
In early September 2022 it was reported that RTSH had decided to select the winner of the festival using a system containing a public vote. Instead, the Albanian Eurovision representative will be selected by a separate televoting system.

"Duje" competed in the first semi-final of that year's contest. As Albina was considered an Established artist, she would automatically move onto the final of the contest. Heading into the final, the song was a fan favorite to win the televoting, winning fan polls on Eurovision fansites Wiwibloggs and ESCUnited. In the final, "Duje" would come second in the jury voting, being beaten by Elsa Lila's song, "Evita" as the overall winner of Festivali i Këngës 61. However, "Duje" would come first overall in the televote, earning the Albanian spot for the Eurovision Song Contest 2023.

At Eurovision 

References 

2022 songs
2022 singles
Eurovision songs of Albania
Eurovision songs of 2023